Nga Tawa Diocesan School, also known as the Wellington Diocesan School for Girls, is a state-integrated, Anglican girls’ boarding school situated in the heart of the Rangitikei District. It is located just outside the township of Marton in New Zealand.

History
The school was founded near Shannon in 1891 by Mary Taylor. She named her school Nga Tawa because of the tawa trees that grew nearby. In 1909, the school relocated from Shannon to Calico Line, where it stands today. The original buildings were destroyed by fire in 1924. Originally a private school, Nga Tawa integrated into the state education system in 1980.

Today, the school has roughly 200 pupils, most of whom are boarders. The school also accepts a growing number of international students. These students mainly come from but are not limited to, Europe and Asia.

Co-curricular
Nga Tawa students participate in a wide variety of sporting disciplines. The focus of the school is on equestrian sport. There is stabling capacity for 80 horses on school grounds as well as a dressage arena, a full-sized showjumping arena, 1200m all-weather canter track, and a cross-country course.

There are multiple cultural activities offered at the school. Nga Tawa students are represented in a varied array of disciplines and arts, particularly given the significantly smaller student body than most of their local competitors

Academic
The school previously offered the International Baccalaureate exams (up until the end of the 2013 academic year) as well as the New Zealand NCEA exams.

Notable alumnae

 Judy Bailey – television newsreader
 Iris Crooke – nurse and volunteer worker, Florence Nightingale Medal recipient
 Anne Gambrill – lawyer and jurist
 Jackie Gowler – rower
 Kerri Gowler – rower
 Virginia Grayson – artist, Dobell Prize winner
 Gil Hanly – photographer
 Paige Hourigan – tennis player
 Georgia Nugent-O'Leary – rower
 Alison Quentin-Baxter – constitutional lawyer
 Rebecca Sinclair – snowboarder
 Susan Skerman – painter
 Shirley Smith – lawyer

References

External links
 

Boarding schools in New Zealand
Educational institutions established in 1891
Girls' schools in New Zealand
International Baccalaureate schools in New Zealand
Secondary schools in Manawatū-Whanganui
Anglican schools in New Zealand
1891 establishments in New Zealand
Rangitikei District
Alliance of Girls' Schools Australasia